Sporting Love is a musical written by Stanley Lupino with music by Billy Mayerl, lyrics by Desmond Carter and Frank Eyton.

Produced by Lupino, it opened at the Gaiety Theatre, London on 31 March 1934 and ran for 302 performances, closing on 26 January the following year.

In 1936 it was adapted as a film Sporting Love starring Lupino, featuring some of the original stage cast.

Plot
Brothers Percy and Peter Brace scheme to avoid imminent bankruptcy by gambling on the horses. They would also dearly love to marry to marry sisters Mabel and Maude, if only the girls' hostile father Gerald could be brought round. The brothers hit on a mad cap scheme to inherit money from a rich aunt, but farcical mix-ups ensure things do not go according to plan.

Stage cast
Peter Brace - Laddie Cliff
Percy Brace - Stanley Lupino
Gerald Dane - Arthur Rigby Jr.
Maud Dane - Marjorie Browne
Mabel Dane - Vera Bryer
Nelly Grey - Jenny Dean
Prologue/Andy Dene - James Croome
Claude Barrington - Arty Ash
Stable Lad - Guy Vaughan
Groom - Ewart Watt
Trainer/Bert Bray - Peter Miller
Jack Lester - Basil Howes
Freddy Croome - Harry Milton
Norman Drew/Henry Bernard - William Lorimer
Wilfred Wimple - Wyn Weaver
Lord Dimsdale - Henry Carlisle
Maid - Irene North
June Westley - Gilly Flower
Fanny Maydew - Eileen Munro

References

1934 musicals
West End musicals
British musicals
British plays adapted into films